Frank Edward Guernsey (October 15, 1866 – January 1, 1927) was a U.S. Representative from Maine.

Early life
Guernsey the son of Edward Hersey Guernsey and Hannah (Thompson) Guernsey was born in Dover, Maine on October 15, 1866.

Education
Guernsey attended the common schools, Foxcroft Academy, Eastern Maine Conference Seminary, Bucksport, Maine, Wesleyan Seminary, Kents Hill, Maine, and Eastman's College, Poughkeepsie, New York.

Family life
Guernsey married Josephine Frances Lyford on June 16, 1887, in Vinal Haven, Maine.  They had a son Thompson L. Guernsey, who was born at Dover on February 17, 1904.

Legal career
Guernsey studied law in the office of Honorable Willis E. Parsons, of Foxcroft, Maine, he was admitted to the bar in September, 1890 and commenced practice in Dover, Maine.

Early political career
Guernsey was elected treasurer of Piscataquis County, Maine in In September, 1890, and he was re-elected twice, serving in this office until December 31, 1896.

Service in the Maine legislature
Guernsey served as member of the Maine House of Representatives from 1897 to 1899. He served in the Maine Senate in 1903.

Congressional service
Guernsey was elected as a Republican to the Sixtieth Congress to fill the vacancy caused by the death of Llewellyn Powers.
Guernsey was reelected to the Sixty-first and to the three succeeding Congresses and served from November 3, 1908, to March 3, 1917.
He did not run for reelection but was an unsuccessful candidate for the Republican nomination for Senator.

1908 Republican National Convention
Guernsey served as delegate to the Republican National Convention in 1908.

Later business career
In 1905 Guernsey was elected as the president of the Piscataquis Savings Bank.  He was also a trustee of the University of Maine.

Death and burial
Guernsey died in Boston, Massachusetts, January 1, 1927. He was interred in Dover Cemetery, Dover-Foxcroft, Maine.

End notes

References

1866 births
1927 deaths
Republican Party Maine state senators
Republican Party members of the Maine House of Representatives
People from Dover-Foxcroft, Maine
Methodists from Maine
Republican Party members of the United States House of Representatives from Maine
Foxcroft Academy alumni